Jang Hye-young is a South Korean politician and human rights activist for the disabled and the LGBTQ+ community. She is an incumbent lawmaker and has proposed anti-discrimination laws. Jang's fight for rights for the disabled means a lot to her on the personal level, as she has an autistic sister. In 2018, she released a documentary about their shared life together. This award-winning documentary gained her recognition as a disability rights activist and filmmaker.  Jang is a member of the Progressive Justice Party of Korea.

She was selected for the Time 100 Next 2021.

Early life 
Jang Hye-Yeong was born in South Korea. Jang grew up with an autistic sister. Her mother received little to no support in caring for her disabled child from the government or those around her, and ultimately the family decided to place the child in an institution. According to Jang, her sister was mistreated and abused there. Shortly afterwards, Jang's mother left her family and her father sent her to stay under the care of her grandparents. The childhood trauma that Jang faced ultimately pushed her to become an activist. In 2011, Jang made the decision to drop out of the highly prestigious Yonsei University to take care of her younger sister, 18 years after she had been placed in the institution.

Filmography 
In 2018, Jang decided to release a documentary called Grown Up. The documentary details the first few months of her life living with and caring for her sister, who has severe developmental delays. The documentary, which has been highly praised, shed light on the state of the disabled in South Korea.

Political career 
Jang is a member of the left-wing Progressive Justice Party. Jang, at just age 35, is one of the South Korea's youngest ever lawmakers. Jang has made many efforts to ensure the rights of the disabled and members of the LGBT community. She joined the Korean National Assembly in 2020. The same year Jang made headlines when she claimed sexual harassment by former party leader, Kim Jong-Cheol. Kim admitted to the assault and resigned from his position.

References

External links
Official website 

1987 births
Living people
South Korean disability rights activists
South Korean social democrats
South Korean feminists
South Korean progressives
Liberalism in South Korea
Justice Party (South Korea) politicians
Justice Party (South Korea)